The Erichsen Mansion (Danish: Erichsens Palæ) is a historic building located at Kongens Nytorv in central Copenahgen9, Denmark. It is now part of Danske Bank's headquarters.

History

Erich Erichsen's house

The Erichsen Mansion was built for merchant and shipowner Erich Erichsen in 1799. It was designed by Caspar Frederik Harsdorff but when he died later that same year it was completed by his son-in-law Gottfried Schaper in 1801.

Jørgensen and Hansen

Rasmus Jørgensen, known as Specie-Jørgensen, purchased the building in 1833. In 1846, he sold it to royal furniture maker Christopher Bagnæs Hansen.

Bank headquarters
Kjøbenhavns Handelsbank acquired the building in 1888. The building was subsequently restored and adapted for its new use under supervision of the architect Frederik Levy. It was completed on 18 April 1891.

Architecture
The building has a central projection with Ionic order columns supporting a triangular pediment. The relief depicting Mercury and Minerva shaking hands over an altar was designed by G. D. Gianelli. According to  Schaper, Harsdorff had opposed this design since free-standing columns were deemed too dominant in private house design.

The interior is richly decorated by the French architect Joseph-Jacques Ramée and the French painter Pierre Étienne Lesueur with murals and frescos in Pompeian style.

References

External links

 Rendering in the Danish National Art Library
 

Houses in Copenhagen
Listed residential buildings in Copenhagen
Caspar Frederik Harsdorff buildings